Józef Lipień (born 6 February 1949 in Jaczków) is a Polish wrestler (Greco-Roman style), twin brother of the Polish wrestler Kazimierz Lipień.

References
sports-reference.com
sports123.com
Profile (Polish)

1949 births
Living people
People from Wałbrzych County
Olympic silver medalists for Poland
Olympic wrestlers of Poland
Wrestlers at the 1968 Summer Olympics
Wrestlers at the 1972 Summer Olympics
Wrestlers at the 1976 Summer Olympics
Wrestlers at the 1980 Summer Olympics
Polish male sport wrestlers
Olympic medalists in wrestling
Sportspeople from Lower Silesian Voivodeship
Medalists at the 1980 Summer Olympics
20th-century Polish people
21st-century Polish people